A number of citrus fruits are grown in or strongly associated with Japan. Many of these fruits are of Chinese origin, but have been modified or specially bred for cultivation in Japan.

Japanese taxonomy

Japan usually follows the botanical names of the taxonomy from Tyôzaburô Tanaka, often referred to as the "Tanaka system", giving for each cultivar a separate name no matter if it is pure or a hybrid of two or more species or varieties. While elsewhere it is more popular to classify the genus citrus into species, and further into varieties, and then into cultivars or hybrid. Such a system was created by Walter Tennyson Swingle from Florida and is called the "Swingle system".  The different approaches of the two systems lead to partially-overlapping or nested 'species', for example, Citrus unshiu and Citrus tangerina (Tanaka) versus Citrus reticulata (Swingle). Likewise, common terms, like "mikan", do not always align with these taxonomic groups.

Japanese citrus (partial list)
Japanese citrus fruits include the following:

References

External links
Japanese citrus glossary

Citrus
Japanese fruit
Lists of plants
Citrus